Cloone is a village in County Leitrim, Ireland.

Cloone  may also refer to:

Cloone, Loughmoe East, a townland in County Tipperary, Ireland
Cloone River, in County Leitrim, Ireland